Creevy (Ir. An Chraobhaigh 'the place of branches or trees') is a townland in the County Down parish of Aghaderg, in the barony of Iveagh, near Loughbrickland, Banbridge, N. Ireland.

Creevy has an area of 470.82 acres.

Sources
Placenamesni.org

Villages in County Down
Civil parish of Aghaderg